The family Alucitidae, consists of the moths known as the many-plumed moths. This is a list of the Australian members of Alucitidae. It also acts as an index to the species articles and forms part of the full List of moths of Australia.

Alucita acascaea (Turner, 1913)
Alucita agapeta (Turner, 1913)
Alucita phricodes Meyrick, 1886
Alucita pygmaea Meyrick, 1890
Alucita xanthodes Meyrick, 1890
Alucita xanthosticta (Turner, 1923)

External links
Alucitidae at the Australian Faunal Directory

Australia